Carlo Villa (born 28 May 1912 in Seregno) was an Italian professional football player.

1912 births
Year of death missing
People from Seregno
Italian footballers
Serie A players
Inter Milan players
Genoa C.F.C. players
Novara F.C. players
A.C. Milan players
U.S. 1913 Seregno Calcio players
Association football midfielders
Footballers from Lombardy
Sportspeople from the Province of Monza e Brianza